The 2006 Catalunya GP2 Series round were a pair of motor races held on 13 and 14 May 2006 at the Circuit de Catalunya in Montmeló, Catalonia, Spain as part of the GP2 Series. It was the fourth round of the 2006 GP2 season.

Classification

Qualifying

Feature Race

Sprint Race

Standings after the round

 Drivers' Championship standings

 Teams' Championship standings

 Note: Only the top five positions are included for both sets of standings.

References

External links 
 Official website of GP2 Series

Barcelona
GP2